Salce, also known as Salce de Sayago, is a municipality located in the province of Zamora, Castile and León, Spain. According to the 2004 census (INE), the municipality has a population of 127 inhabitants.

See also
List of municipalities in Zamora

References

External links

Municipalities of the Province of Zamora